Thomas Affleck (July 13, 1812  – December 30, 1868) was a Scottish-American nurseryman, almanac editor, and agrarian writer and Southern planter. He published the Southern Rural Almanac and Plantation and Garden Calendar from 1851 to 1861.

He and his wife, Anna M. Dunbar Smith, owned Ingleside, an estate in Washington, Mississippi, where he founded his Southern Nurseries, one of the earliest nurseries in the South. His wife also owned several plantations in Adams and Wilkinson Counties. In the mid-1850s, Affleck purchased Glenblythe Plantation in Gay Hill, Washington County, Texas, where he, his family, and enslaved people moved in 1860. Affleck also published Affleck's Southern Rural Almanac and Plantation and Garden Calendar from Ingleside, 1851 to 1859, and Glenblythe, 1860 to 1861. At Glenblythe, he established Central Nurseries. He was the first Southern writer whose work on plants was widely read; he also published two best-selling and pioneering guides for cotton and sugar plantation and farming accounting.

Early life
Thomas Affleck was born on July 13, 1812, in Dumfries, Scotland. His father was Thomas Affleck and his mother, Mary (Hannay) Affleck. He graduated from the University of Edinburgh, where he studied agriculture. Not yet 20, he immigrated to the United States, arriving on May 4, 1832.

Career
From 1832 to 1840, he worked as a clerk and merchant in New York City, Pennsylvania, Indiana and Ohio. He served as the editor of the Western Farmer and Gardener in Cincinnati, Ohio from 1840 to 1842.

He acquired Ingleside Farm in Washington, Mississippi, where he established Southern Nurseries in 1848. It became one of the earliest commercial plant nurseries in the Southern United States. He was one of the first nurserymen in the South, selling plants and writing about plants from the South. Most agricultural and gardening advice had previously been written by authorities from Europe or the Northern United States.

In 1848, Affleck edited Norman's Southern Agricultural Almanac, an almanac published by Benjamin Moore Norman (1809-1860). He also published the Southern Rural Almanac and Plantation and Garden Calendar from 1851 to 1861. His "Report on Agricultural Grasses,"  appeared as a Senate executive document in 1879. He is credited with advancing agriculture in Texas thanks to his writing. Moreover, he published two books about his plantation, where he cultivated the commodity crops of cotton and sugar cane with slave labor: Cotton Plantation Record and Account Book and Sugar Plantation Record and Account Book. They became widely popular among the planter class, who used them as models for their own plantations.

In 1859, he purchased the Glenblythe Plantation in Gay Hill, Washington County, Texas. He discovered the Old Gay Hill Red China rose, which is native to Gay Hill. He also made mustang wine with mustang grapes found on the plantation. During the American Civil War of 1861–1865, he invited Thomas Neville Waul (1813–1903), a brigadier general in the Confederate States Army, to organize the Waul's Legion on the Texas plantation, who used it as a military camp.

Affleck supported recruiting more English and Scottish immigrants to come to Texas. He tried to establish beef-packing factories with direct shipping lines from Texas to Europe.

Personal life
He married Anna Dunbar Smith, the niece of Jane Herbert Wilkinson Long (1798–1880), on April 19, 1842, in Washington, Mississippi. They had one son, Isaac Dunbar Affleck, who married the poet Mary Hunt Affleck.

Death
He died on December 30, 1868, on the Glenblythe Plantation in Gay Hill, Washington County, Texas.

Bibliography

 Bee-Breeding in the West (1841)
 Cotton Plantation Record and Account Book (1847)
 Sugar Plantation Record and Account Book (1848)
 Hedging and Hedging Plants in the Southern States (1869)

References

1812 births
1868 deaths
Scottish emigrants to the United States
People from Dumfries
People from Washington, Mississippi
People from Washington County, Texas
Alumni of the University of Edinburgh
American planters
American agricultural writers
American male non-fiction writers
Farmers from Mississippi
American slave owners